Oleg Dmitriyev may refer to:

 Oleg Dmitriyev (poet) (born 1937), Soviet Russian poet and translator
 Oleg Dmitriyev (footballer, born 1973), Russian football player
 Oleg Dmitriyev (footballer, born 1995), Russian football player